Michael F. Sheahan formerly served as Sheriff of Cook County, Illinois and as a Chicago alderman.

Early life
Sheahan was born in 1944 or 1945.

He received a Master of Education from Governors State University and a bachelor's degree from Saint Joseph's College.

Early career
Sheahan worked as a high school teacher and coach from 1967 through 1971. From 1971 through 1979, he worked as an officer for the Chicago Police Department.

Chicago alderman
In 1979, Sheahan was elected alderman from Chicago's 19th Ward, taking office in the Chicago City Council on April 16, 1979.

He was reelected in 1983 and 1987.

During the Council Wars of the mayoralty of Harold Washington, Sheahan was a member of the Vrdolyak 29, a bloc of alderman, led by Edward Vrdolyak, which stood in opposition to Washington. Amid the Washington mayoralty, Sheahan even spoke of possibly switching to the Republican Party.

During the period in which Eugene Sawyer was mayor, he was considered supportive of the mayor. He was also considered a political ally of mayor Richard M. Daley.

Cook County Sheriff

1990 election

Corruption allegations had taken a toll on incumbent Republican James E. O'Grady's prospects for reelection. O'Grady ultimately had failed to live up to his 1986 campaign promises of disposing of politics and corruption in the Cook County Sheriff's Office, and had become unpopular among his constituents.

Amid the 1990 campaign, a Cook County correctional officer was shot and critically wounded while hanging signs for Sheahan outside of the South Side bar. Three men, including a correctional officer who supported O'Grady, were arrested for this. This led to a decline of O'Grady's support in the polls. Additionally, an incident soon after occurred where Sheahan had a campaign office shot at.

In 1990, Sheahan defeated O'Grady by a broad margin. O'Grady suffered one of biggest defeats that a Republican Party nominee had experienced in a countywide Cook County election in years. Sheahan had managed to beat O'Grady in 24 of the county's 30 suburban townships and in every ward of Chicago. Sheahan had even managed to carry many of the county's Republican strongholds.

Tenure
Sheahan was reelected in 1994, 1998, and 2002.

Early into his tenure, he received praise for running what appeared to be a much less corrupt Sheriff's Office than his predecessors had. To "clean up" the office, he ended the practice of soliciting sheriff's workers for political contributions, and he fired dozens of "ghost workers" who were paid for no-show jobs. He also ended the long-corrupt part-time deputy program.

Sheahan received praise for programs such as a boot camp for first-time offenders. He also received criticism over abuse of inmates by jail guards.

Sheahan regularly butted heads with members of the Cook County Board of Commissioners.

In November 2005, he announced that he would not be seeking reelection the following year. His term would end in December 2006.

Personal life
Shehan and his wife Nancy have six children, Katie, Michael, Terrence, Timothy, Patrick, and Ryan.

His brother James "Skinny" Sheahan is a civic leader on Chicago's Southwest Side. Richard M. Daley appointed him as Chicago's Director of Special Events in 1993. He would long serve as a Daley aid. James sits on the board of Special Olympics Chicago.

Electoral history

Aldermanic

Sheriff
1990

1994

1998

2002

References

Sheriffs of Cook County, Illinois
Illinois Democrats
Governors State University alumni
Saint Joseph's College (Indiana) alumni
Chicago City Council members
Date of birth unknown